Tip is the debut studio album by Canadian rock band Finger Eleven, after their first, Letters from Chutney, was released under their old name of Rainbow Butt Monkeys in 1995. The band was dropped from their record label in 1997, six weeks after the album was released in Canada. They were picked up by Wind-up and the album was re-released on September 15, 1998, to the U.S. and Canada.

On October 1, 2014, the album received gold certification in Canada, representing sales of 50,000 units.

Track listing

Extra Information
All songs written by James Black, Scott Anderson and Arnold Lanni except:
"Quicksand", written by Black, Scott Anderson, Lanni and Rob Gommerman
"Shudder" and "Condenser", written by Black, Scott Anderson, Lanni, Sean Anderson
Differences exist between the two releases of Tip:
"Awake and Dreaming" was named "Consolation Day" and included an extra verse. Cello, feedback and percussion were added for the re-release.
"Above" features a new vocal track.
"Thin Spirits" contains different guitar tracks.
Album art within, changed.

Chart positions
Singles

Credits

Finger Eleven
Scott Anderson - vocals
James Black - guitar, vocals
Rick Jackett - guitar
Sean Anderson - bass
Rob Gommerman - drums

Additional personnel
Arnold Lanni - producer
Angelo Caruso - engineer
Howie Weinberg - mastering

References

1997 albums
Finger Eleven albums
Albums produced by Arnold Lanni
Wind-up Records albums